Joep van der Sluijs (born 1 December 2001) is a Dutch professional footballer who plays as a forward for TOP Oss on loan from NEC.

Career 
Born in Druten, Van der Sluijs progressed through the youth system of NEC Nijmegen and had featured for the side between 2018 and 2020 before earning promotion to the senior team.

He signed his first senior contract with the Dutch club NEC Nijmegen after getting promotion from the youth team in 2020. He would represent for the club in 2020–21 Eerste Divisie season. He played his debut match against FC Volendam on 15 September 2020 which ended 3–1 with NEC Nijmegen taking the three points. He scored his professional goal and debut goal for the club against FC Eindhoven on 3 October 2020 where he found his goal by the assist of Rangelo Janga in the 54th minute of the game. The match ended 6–0 to NEC Nijmegen. Van der Sluijs scored his second goal against MVV Maastricht on 30 November 2020 in the 80th minute of the match. The goal was a winner as the match ended 2–1 for NEC Nijmegen.

After NEC's promotion to Eredivisie, van der Sluijs was moved to the Under-21 squad and did not make any senior squad appearances in the 2021–22 season, also suffering an injury midseason.

On 27 July 2022, van der Sluijs was loaned to TOP Oss for a season.

Career statistics

References

External links 
 Joep van der Sluijs at NEC Nijmegen
 Joep van der Sluijs at Tribuna
 Joep van der Sluijs at Football Critic
 

2001 births
Living people
Dutch footballers
Association football forwards
NEC Nijmegen players
TOP Oss players
Eerste Divisie players
People from Druten
Footballers from Gelderland